Río Piedras is a rapid transit station in San Juan agglomeration, Puerto Rico. It is located between Cupey and Universidad stations on the only line of the Tren Urbano system, in the downtown area of Río Piedras (Río Piedras Pueblo), in the city of San Juan. The station is named after Río Piedras where it is located, itself named after the Piedras River which crosses the area. The trial service ran in 2004, however, the regular service only started on 6 June 2005.

Nearby 
 Río Piedras Pueblo (downtown Río Piedras)
 José de Diego pedestrian street
 Plaza del Mercado de Río Piedras (Río Piedras marketplace building)
 University of Puerto Rico, Río Piedras campus

Gallery

References

Tren Urbano stations
Railway stations in the United States opened in 2004
2004 establishments in Puerto Rico